The 61st Filmfare Awards were held to honor the best films of 2015 on 15 January 2016 at NSCI Dome in Mumbai. The ceremony was hosted by Shah Rukh Khan and Kapil Sharma.

Bajirao Mastani led the ceremony with 14 nominations, followed by Piku with 8 nominations, Tanu Weds Manu Returns with 7 nominations and Badlapur with 6 nominations respectively.

Bajirao Mastani won 9 awards including Best Film, Best Director (for Sanjay Leela Bhansali), Best Actor (for Ranveer Singh) and Best Supporting Actress (for Priyanka Chopra), thus becoming the most-awarded film at the ceremony. 

Other major winners included Piku with 5 awards, Dum Laga Ke Haisha, Roy, Talvar, and Tanu Weds Manu Returns with 2, and Bajrangi Bhaijaan, Bombay Velvet, Dil Dhadakne Do, Hero, Masaan and Tamasha with 1.

Deepika Padukone received dual nominations for Best Actress for her performances in Bajirao Mastani and Piku, winning for the latter.

Priyanka Chopra, who won Best Supporting Actress for Bajirao Mastani, became the first actress to win Filmfare Awards in 5 different competitive acting categories.

Winners & Nominees 
The nominations were announced on 11 January 2016.

Awards

Main awards

Critics' awards

Technical Awards

Special awards

Multiple nominations 
 Bajirao Mastani – 14
 Piku – 8
 Tanu Weds Manu Returns – 7
 Badlapur – 6
 Dil Dhadakne Do, Dilwale, Dum Laga Ke Haisha, Talvar – 5
 Bajrangi Bhaijaan, Roy, Tamasha – 4
 Shaandaar – 3

Multiple awards 
 Bajirao Mastani – 9
 Piku – 5
 Dum Laga Ke Haisha, Roy, Talvar, Tanu Weds Manu Returns – 2

Telecast

The ceremony was telecasted on Sony Television on 7 February 2016 at 8 pm IST

The coverage was made available on www.sonyliv.com and Sony Liv mobile app from 8 February 2016 onwards.

References

External links 
 Filmfare Award 2016 Sonyliv 
 Filmfare Official Website
 Filmfare Awards 2016
 Filmfare Awards 2017

Indian
Filmfare Awards